The 2017 FIBA 3x3 Under-18 Europe Cup was the third edition of the Under-18 3x3 Europe Championships that was organized by FIBA Europe and was held between 1 and 3 September 2017, in Debrecen, Hungary. This 3x3 basketball event featured separate competitions for men's and women's national teams.

Qualification

The qualification events took place in Szolnok, Hungary and Riga, Latvia on 5-6 August 2017. A total of 12 teams of each gender will be qualified for the championship through one of two qualifying tournaments.

Men

Women

See also 
 2017 FIBA 3x3 Europe Cup

References

External links
Official website

2017
International basketball competitions hosted by Hungary
2017 in 3x3 basketball
2017–18 in Hungarian basketball
Sport in Debrecen
September 2017 sports events in Europe